Walpurgis Night, an abbreviation of Saint Walpurgis Night (from the German  ), also known as Saint Walpurga's Eve (alternatively spelled Saint Walburga's Eve), is the eve of the Christian feast day of Saint Walpurga, an 8th-century abbess in Francia, and is celebrated on the night of 30 April and the day of 1 May. This feast commemorates the canonization of Saint Walpurga and the movement of her relics to Eichstätt, both of which occurred on 1 May 870.

Saint Walpurga was hailed by the Christians of Germany for battling "pest, rabies, and whooping cough, as well as against witchcraft". Christians prayed to God through the intercession of Saint Walpurga in order to protect themselves from witchcraft, as Saint Walpurga was successful in converting the local populace to Christianity. In parts of Europe, people continue to light bonfires on Saint Walpurga's Eve in order to ward off evil spirits and witches. Others have historically made Christian pilgrimages to Saint Walburga's tomb in Eichstätt on the Feast of Saint Walburga, often obtaining vials of Saint Walburga's oil.

It is suggested that Walpurgis Night is linked with older May Day festivals in northern Europe, which also involved lighting bonfires at night, for example the Gaelic festival Beltane.

Local variants of Walpurgis Night are observed throughout Northern and Central Europe in the Netherlands, Germany, the Czech Republic, Slovakia, Slovenia, Sweden, Lithuania, Latvia, Finland, and Estonia. In Finland, Denmark and Norway, the tradition with bonfires to ward off the witches is observed as Saint John's Eve, which commemorates the Nativity of Saint John the Baptist.

Name
In English, it is known as Saint Walpurga's Night, Saint Walburga's Night, Walpurgis Night, Saint Walpurga's Eve, Saint Walburga's Eve, the Feast of Saint Walpurga or the Feast of Saint Walburga.

History 

The festival of Walpurgis Night is named after the English Christian missionary Saint Walpurga ( 710–777/9). The daughter of Saint Richard the Pilgrim and sister of Saint Willibald, Saint Walpurga (also known as Saint Walpurgis or Walburga) was born in Devon, England in A.D. 710. Born into a prominent Anglo-Saxon family, Saint Walpurga studied medicine and became a Christian missionary to Germany, where she founded a double monastery in Heidenheim. As such, Christian artwork often depicts her holding bandages in her hand. As a result of Saint Walpurga's evangelism in Germany, the people there converted to Christianity from heathenism. In addition, "the monastery became an education center and 'soon became famous as a center of culture'". Saint Walpurga was also known to repel the effects of witchcraft. Saint Walpurga died on 25 February 777 (some sources say 778 or 779) and her tomb, to this day, produces holy oil (known as Saint Walburga's oil), which is said to heal sickness; Benedictine nuns distribute this oil in vials to Christian pilgrims who visit Saint Walpurga's tomb.

The canonization of Walpurga and the movement of her relics to Eichstätt occurred on 1 May in the year 870, thus leading to the Feast of Saint Walpurga and its eve, Walpurgis Night, being popularly observed on this date. She quickly became one of the most popular saints in England, Germany, and France. When the bishop had Saint Walpurga's relics moved to Eichstätt, "miraculous cures were reported as her remains traveled along the route". Miracle cures were later reported from ailing people who anointed themselves with a fluid known as Walburga's oil that drained from the rock at her shrine at Eichstatt.

The date of Walpurgis Night coincided with an older May Eve festival, celebrated in much of northern Europe with the lighting of bonfires at night. A variety of festivals of pre-Christian origin had been celebrated at this time (halfway between the spring equinox and summer solstice) to mark the beginning of summer, including Beltane in Ireland and Britain. Folklorist Jack Santino says "Her day and its traditions almost certainly are traceable to pre-Christian celebrations that took place at this time, on the first of May". Art historian Pamela Berger noted Walpurga's association with sheaves of grain, and suggested that her cult was adapted from pagan agrarian goddesses.

In modern times, many Christians continue to make religious pilgrimages to Saint Walburga's tomb in Eichstätt on Saint Walburga's Day; in the 19th century, the number of pilgrims travelling to the Church of St. Walpurgis was described as "many thousand". Due to 1 May the date of Saint Walpurga's feast, it has become associated with other May Day celebrations and regional traditions, especially in Finland and Sweden. Given that the intercession of Saint Walpurga was believed to be efficacious against evil magic, medieval and Renaissance tradition held that, during Walpurgis Night, witches celebrated a sabbath and evil powers were at their strongest. In German folklore, Walpurgis Night was believed to be the night of a witches' meeting on the Brocken, the highest peak in the Harz Mountains, a range of wooded hills in central Germany. To ward off evil and protect themselves and their livestock, people would traditionally light fires on the hillsides, a tradition that continues in some regions today. In Bavaria, the feast day is sometimes called , literally "Witches' Night", on which revelers dress as witches and demons, set off fireworks, dance and play loud music, which is said to drive the witches and winter spirits away.

Regional variations

Czech Republic 

Young people gather around. Sudden black and dense smoke formations are cheered as "a witch flying away". An effigy of a witch is held up and thrown into a bonfire to burn.

In some places, it is customary to burn a puppet representing a witch on the bonfire. It is still a widespread feast in the Czech Republic, practiced since the pagan times.

As evening advances to midnight and fire is on the wane, it is time to go search for a cherry tree in blossom. This is another feast, connected with 1 May. Young women should be kissed past midnight (and during the following day) under a blossoming cherry (or if unavailable, another blossoming) tree, as they "will not dry up" for an entire year. The First of May is celebrated then as "the day of those in love", in reference to the famous incipit of the poem Máj by Karel Hynek Mácha ("Late evening, on the first of May— / The twilit May—the time of love", translation by Edith Pargeter).

England
In Lincolnshire, Walpurgis Night was observed in rural communities until the second half of the 20th century, with a tradition of hanging cowslips to ward off evil.

Estonia 

In Estonia,  is celebrated throughout the night of 30 April and into the early hours of 1 May, where 1 May is a public holiday called "Spring Day".  is an important and widespread celebration of the arrival of spring in the country. Influenced by German culture, the night originally stood for the gathering and meeting of witches. Modern people still dress up as witches to wander the streets in a carnival-like mood.

The  celebrations are especially vigorous in Tartu, the university town in southern Estonia. For Estonian students in student corporations (Estonian fraternities and sororities), the night starts with a traditional procession through the streets of Tartu, followed by visiting each other's corporation houses throughout the night.

Finland 

In Finland, Walpurgis night (Valborg) is one of the four biggest holidays along with Christmas Eve, New Year's Eve, and Midsummer. Walpurgis witnesses the biggest carnival-style festival held in Finland's cities and towns. The celebration, which begins on the evening of 30 April and continues on 1 May, typically centres on the consumption of sima, sparkling wine and other alcoholic beverages. Since the end of the 19th century, this traditional upper-class feast has been appropriated by university students. Many high school alumni wear the black and white student cap and many higher education students wear student coveralls. One tradition is to drink sima, a home-made low-alcohol mead, along with freshly cooked tippaleipä.

Both are sophomoric; but while  is a standard magazine,  is always a gimmick. Classic forms have included an  printed on toilet paper and on a bedsheet. Often,  has been stuffed inside standard industrial packages, such as sardine cans and milk cartons. For most university students,  starts a week before the day of celebration. The festivities also include a picnic on 1 May, which is sometimes more lavish, particularly in Ullanlinnanmäki in central Helsinki.

In Turku, it has become a tradition to cap the Posankka statue.

 coincides with the socialist International Workers' Day parade. Expanding from the parties of the left, the whole of the Finnish political scene has adopted  as the day to go out on stumps and agitate. This is not limited only to political activists; many institutions, such as the Lutheran Church of Finland, have followed suit, marching and making speeches. Left-wing activists of the 1970s still party on May Day. Carnivals are arranged, and many radio stations play leftist songs, such as The Internationale.

Traditionally, 1 May is celebrated by the way of a picnic in a park. For most, the picnic is enjoyed with friends on a blanket with food and sparkling wine. Some people arrange extremely lavish picnics with pavilions, white tablecloths, silver candelabras, classical music and extravagant food. The picnic usually starts early in the morning, where some of the previous night's party-goers continue their celebrations from the previous night.

Some student organisations reserve areas where they traditionally camp every year. Student caps, mead, streamers and balloons have their role in the picnic and the celebration as a whole.

Germany 

On the Feast of Saint Walburga, "many thousand" people have made Christian pilgrimages to Saint Walburga's tomb in Eichstätt on the Feast of Saint Walburga, often obtaining vials of Saint Walburga's oil.

In Germany,  ('Witches' Night'), the night from 30 April to 1 May, is the night when witches are reputed to hold a large celebration on the Brocken and await the arrival of spring and is held on the same night as Saint Walpurgis Night.

A scene in Goethe's Faust Part One is called "," and one in Faust Part Two is called "Classical ." The last chapter of book five in Thomas Mann's The Magic Mountain is also called "." In Edward Albee's 1962 play Who's Afraid of Virginia Woolf?, Act Two is entitled "."

From Bram Stoker's short story, Dracula's Guest, an Englishman (whose name is never mentioned) is on a visit to Munich before leaving for Transylvania. It is Walpurgis Night, and in spite of the hotelier's warning not to be late coming back, the young man later leaves his carriage and wanders toward the direction of an abandoned "unholy" village. As the carriage departs with the frightened and superstitious driver, a tall and thin stranger scares the horses at the crest of a hill.

In some parts of northern coastal regions of Germany, the custom of lighting huge fires is still kept alive to celebrate the coming of May, while most parts of Germany have a derived Christianized custom around Easter called "Easter fires".

In rural parts of southern Germany, it is part of popular youth culture to play pranks such as tampering with neighbours' gardens, hiding possessions, or spraying graffiti on private property.

In Berlin, traditional leftist May Day riots usually start at Walpurgis Night in the Mauerpark in Prenzlauer Berg. There is a similar tradition in the Schanzenviertel district of Hamburg, though in both cases, the situation has significantly calmed down in the past few years.

The Netherlands 

As in all Germanic countries,  was celebrated in areas of what is now the Netherlands. It has not been celebrated recently due to the national  (Queen's Day) falling on the same date, though the new  (King's Day) is on 27 April. The island of Texel celebrates a festival known as the '' (roughly translated as 'May-Blaze') on that same day, where bonfires are lit near nightfall, just as on Walpurgis, but with the meaning to drive away the remaining cold of winter and welcome spring. Occasional mentions to the ritual occur, and at least once a feminist called group co-opted the name to call for attention to the position of women (following the example of German women's organizations), a variety of the Take Back the Night phenomenon.

In 1999, suspicions were raised among local Reformed party members in Putten, Gelderland of a Heksennacht festival celebrated by Satanists. The party called for a ban. That such a festival even existed, however, and that it was 'Satanic' was rejected by most others. The local Church in Dokkum, Friesland organized a Service in 2003 to pray for the Holy Spirit to, according to the church, counter the Satanic action.

Sweden 
While the name Walpurgis is taken from the 8th-century British Dumnonian Christian missionary Saint Walburga, as it is called in Swedish, also marks the arrival of spring. The forms of celebration vary in different parts of the country and between different cities. Walpurgis celebrations are not a family occasion but rather a public event, and local groups often take responsibility for organising them to encourage community spirit in the village or neighbourhood. Celebrations normally include lighting the bonfire, choral singing and a speech to honour the arrival of the spring season, often held by a local celebrity.

In the Middle Ages, the administrative year ended on 30 April. Accordingly, this was a day of festivity among the merchants and craftsmen of the town, with trick-or-treat, dancing and singing in preparation for the forthcoming celebration of spring. Sir James George Frazer in The Golden Bough writes, "The first of May is a great popular festival in the more midland and southern parts of Sweden. On the eve of the festival, huge bonfires, which should be lighted by striking two flints together, blaze on all the hills and knolls."

Walpurgis bonfires are part of a Swedish tradition dating back to the early 18th century. At Walpurgis, farm animals were let out to graze and bonfires lit to scare away predators. In Southern Sweden, an older tradition, no longer practiced, was for the younger people to collect greenery and branches from the woods at twilight. These were used to adorn the houses of the village. The expected reward for this task was to be paid in eggs.

Choral singing is a popular pastime in Sweden, and on Walpurgis Eve virtually every choir in the country is busy. Singing traditional songs of spring is widespread throughout the country. The songs are mostly from the 19th century and were spread by students' spring festivities. For students, Walpurgis Eve heralds freedom. Traditionally the exams were over and only the odd lecture remained before term ends. On the last day of April, the students don their characteristic white caps and sing songs of welcome to spring, to the budding greenery and to a brighter future.

More modern Valborg celebrations, particularly among Uppsala students, often consist of enjoying a breakfast including champagne and strawberries. During the day, people gather in parks, drink considerable amounts of alcoholic beverages, barbecue, and generally enjoy the weather, if it happens to be favorable.

In Uppsala, since 1975, students honor spring by rafting on Fyris river through the center of town with rickety, homemade, in fact quite easily wreckable, and often humorously decorated rafts.
Several nations also hold "Champagne Races", where students go to drink and spray champagne or sparkling wine on each other. The walls and floors of the old nation buildings are covered in plastic for this occasion, as the champagne is poured around recklessly and sometimes spilled enough to wade in. Spraying champagne is, however, a fairly recent addition to the Champagne Race. The name derives from the students running down the slope from the Carolina Rediviva libra to drink champagne, toward the Student Natione.

In Linköping many students and former students begin the day at the park Trädgårdföreningen, in the field below Belvederen where the city laws permit alcohol, to drink champagne breakfast in a similar way to Uppsala. Later, at three o'clock, the students and public gather at the courtyard of Linköping Castle. Spring songs are sung by the Linköping University Male Voice Choir, and speeches are made by representatives of the students and the university professors.

In Gothenburg, the carnival parade, The Cortège, which has been held since 1909 by the students at Chalmers University of Technology, is an important part of the celebration. It is seen by around 250,000 people each year. Another major event is the gathering of students in Garden Society of Gothenburg to listen to student choirs, orchestras, and speeches. An important part of the gathering is the ceremonial donning of the student cap, which stems from the time when students wore their caps daily and switched from black winter cap to white summer cap.

In Umeå, there is an old tradition of having local bonfires. During recent years, however, there has also been a tradition of celebrating Walpurgis at the Umeå University campus. The university organizes student choir singing, as well as other types of entertainment and a speech by the president of the university. Different stalls sell hot dogs, candy, soft drinks, etc.

United States 
The Church of Satan was founded on Sankt Walpurgisnacht in 1966. Founder Anton Szandor LaVey states in The Satanic Bible that besides one's own birthday, Walpurgisnacht ranks as an important Satanic holiday, noting the Eve of May has been memorialized as "symbolizing the fruition of the spring equinox", and chose the date well aware of the date's traditional association with witchcraft.

Additionally, The Satanic Temple celebrates Hexennacht as "a solemn holiday to honor those who were victimized by superstition".

See also 

 Allhallowtide
Bald Mountain (folklore)
 Beltane
 Diwali
 Easter witch
 May Day
 Mefistofele
 Noc Walpurgi, 2015 film

References

External links 

 The Favors of St. Walpurga - OSV
 Photos of the traditional Walpurgis celebration in Uppsala, Sweden 
 Walpurgis Night Celebration Gråbo Sweden 2012 Video

 
April observances
Christian festivals and holy days
German folklore
International observances
May observances
Saints days
Supernatural legends
Traditions involving fire
Witchcraft in Germany

fi:Vappu